"S.E.X." is the first single by Lyfe Jennings from his second album The Phoenix and features guest vocals from LaLa Brown. The song is about young teens losing their virginity from pressure.

"S.E.X." debuted on the Billboard Hot 100 chart at number 99 and slipped off just to re-enter the following week again at number 99. It eventually peaked at number 37, making it Lyfe's most successful single. "S.E.X." was a top-five hit on the Billboard Hot R&B/Hip-Hop Songs chart and received strong airplay on BET and some airplay on radio and MTV. The music video was directed by Benny Boom.

Charts

Weekly charts

Year-end charts

References

2006 singles
Lyfe Jennings songs
2006 songs
Songs written by Lyfe Jennings